The Haunting or Haunting may refer to:

Film and television
The Haunting (1963 film), a horror film directed by Robert Wise
The Haunting (1999 film), a loose remake of the 1963 film, directed by Jan de Bont
The Haunting (2009 film), a Spanish film by Elio Quiroga
A Haunting, a 2002–2007 and 2012–present American paranormal drama anthology TV series
The Haunting (TV series), a 2018–2020 American anthology series
"The Haunting" (Back at the Barnyard), a 2008 TV episode
"Haunting" (The Watcher), a 2022 TV episode

Literature
The Haunting (Mahy novel), a 1982 children's book by Margaret Mahy
The Haunting (Nixon novel), a 1998 young adult's novel by Joan Lowery Nixon

Music
The Haunting (Clandestine album) or the title song, 1997
The Haunting (Theatre of Ice album), 1982
"Haunting" / "Workout", a single by Andy C, 2013
"The Haunting", a song by Anberlin from Godspeed, 2006
"The Haunting", a song by Avantasia from Ghostlights, 2016
"The Haunting", a song by Symphony X from The Damnation Game, 1995
"The Haunting (Somewhere in Time)", a song by Kamelot from The Black Halo, 2005
"Haunting", a song by Halsey from Badlands, 2015

Video games
The Haunting (video game), a 1993 comedy-horror game

See also
List of haunted paintings
List of reportedly haunted locations
Haunt (disambiguation)
Haunts (disambiguation)
Haunted (disambiguation)
Haunter (disambiguation)